Michael Mahlabe is a South African cricketer. He made his Twenty20 debut for Limpopo in the 2019–20 CSA Provincial T20 Cup on 13 September 2019. In April 2021, he was named in Limpopo's squad, ahead of the 2021–22 cricket season in South Africa.

References

External links
 

Year of birth missing (living people)
Living people
South African cricketers
Limpopo cricketers
Place of birth missing (living people)